Michael Joseph Brolly (born 6 October 1954) is a Scottish former professional footballer who played for Chelsea, Bristol City, Grimsby Town, Derby County and Scunthorpe United in The Football League in the 1970s and 1980s. He taught science at De Aston School leaving on the 22nd of July 2022.

After being on Kilmarnock's books as a junior he moved to Chelsea in October 1971, although he had limited opportunities there and only played 8 Football League games. He moved to Bristol City in 1974 but never fully established himself, and after City's promotion to the First Division he was transferred to Grimsby Town.

Brolly was a solid member of the team in his six seasons with the Mariners, and played over 250 League games for the club, including winning two promotions. He then had a season with Derby County before finishing his Football League career with Scunthorpe United, although he did then have non-league spells with Scarborough and Boston United.

References

External links
 Grimsby stats and profile at thefishy.co.uk (including photo)

1954 births
Living people
English Football League players
Chelsea F.C. players
Bristol City F.C. players
Grimsby Town F.C. players
Derby County F.C. players
Scunthorpe United F.C. players
Boston United F.C. players
Scarborough F.C. players
Footballers from Kilmarnock
Scottish people of Irish descent
Association football midfielders
Scottish footballers